Ursus (floruit 415–416) was a politician of the Eastern Roman Empire, praefectus urbi of Constantinople in 415–416.

Life 

In 415 Ursus was praefectus urbi of Constantinople. On September 4, he escorted the relics of Joseph and Zechariah that were brought in the Great Church; he is attested in office by laws issued on October 31, 415, and February 17, 416. In 415 the Western Emperor, Honorius, had defeated an usurper, Priscus Attalus; on June 28, 416, Ursus celebrated the event with shows in the theatre. That same year, he is also attested in office by a law addressed to him and issued on July 23, while on September 30 he escorted Emperor Theodosius II, returning to Constantinople from Heraclea.

Notes

Sources 
 John Robert Martindale, "Vrsus 3", The Prosopography of the Later Roman Empire, Volume 2, Cambridge University Press, 1980, p. 1192.

5th-century Byzantine people
Urban prefects of Constantinople